The Cat's Pajamas is a 1926 American comedy silent film directed by William A. Wellman and written by Louis D. Lighton, Hope Loring and Ernest Vajda. The film stars Betty Bronson, Ricardo Cortez, Arlette Marchal, Theodore Roberts, Gordon Griffith and Tom Ricketts. The film was released on August 29, 1926, by Paramount Pictures.

Cast 
Betty Bronson as Sally Winton
Ricardo Cortez as Don Cesare Gracco
Arlette Marchal as Riza Dorina
Theodore Roberts as Sally's Father
Gordon Griffith as Jack
Tom Ricketts as Mr. Briggs

Preservation status
The film is now lost.

References

External links 
 

1926 films
1920s English-language films
American comedy films
Paramount Pictures films
Films directed by William A. Wellman
American black-and-white films
Lost American films
American silent feature films
1926 comedy films
Silent American drama films
1920s American films
Silent American comedy films